Francis Chang-Sam (born July 30, 1948) is a barrister-at-law of Gray's Inn of London, an attorney-at-law of the Supreme Court of Seychelles, a Notary Public and a Senior Counsel of the Bar Association of Seychelles. He has been practicing law in the Seychelles for over thirty years.

Career
He started his legal career as a state counsel in the Seychelles Department of Legal Affairs headed by the Attorney General. He later held the post of Registrar General in the same Department where he acted as, among others duties, Registrar of Companies, Registrar of Land and Registrar of Trade Marks. He next served as Legal Draftsman and then Principal Legal Draftsman in the Attorney General’s Office specialising in the drafting of legislations, commercial and other legal documents. He later occupied the post of Attorney General for a period of 6 years. He also headed the Secretariat responsible for drafting the Constitution of the Third Republic of Seychelles.

During his time in the public sector, Mr. Chang-Sam served as board member on a number of Government-owned corporations and statutory bodies (including the board of the Central Bank of Seychelles and the board of Air Seychelles).

Mr. Chang-Sam has now been in private practice for over 10 years. During this time, he has acted as local counsel in respect of several high-profile tourism projects, foreign investments and other major business developments in the Seychelles.

Recently, he has chaired both the National Law and Order Committee and the Constitution Review Committee.

References

External links
Law Chambers of Francis Chang-Sam

1948 births
Living people
Alumni of King's College London
Alumni of the London School of Economics
Seychellois lawyers